Erigonella is a genus of dwarf spiders that was first described by David B. Hirst in 1901.

Species
 it contains five species and one subspecies:
Erigonella groenlandica Strand, 1905 – Canada
Erigonella hiemalis (Blackwall, 1841) (type) – Europe
Erigonella ignobilis (O. Pickard-Cambridge, 1871) – Europe, Russia (Europe to South Siberia)
Erigonella stubbei Heimer, 1987 – Mongolia
Erigonella subelevata (L. Koch, 1869) – Europe
Erigonella s. pyrenaea Denis, 1964 – France

See also
 List of Linyphiidae species (A–H)

References

Araneomorphae genera
Linyphiidae
Palearctic spiders
Spiders of Asia
Spiders of North America
Taxa named by Friedrich Dahl